Kirti Mandir may refer to:

 Kirti Mandir, Vadodara, the cenotaph of Gaekwad rulers of Vadodara
 Kirti Mandir, Porbandar, the birthplace memorial of Mahatma Gandhi